Return to Paradise is an American South Seas adventure drama film released by United Artists in 1953. The film was directed by Mark Robson and starred Gary Cooper, Barry Jones and Roberta Haynes. It was based on a short story, "Mr. Morgan", by James Michener in his 1951 short story collection Return to Paradise, his sequel to his 1947 novel Tales of the South Pacific. It was filmed on location in Matautu, Lefaga Western Samoa (present-day Samoa).

Plot
During the 1920s, itinerant American beachcomber Mr. Morgan (Gary Cooper) is deposited in the village of Matareva on the island of Upolu, Samoa in the South Pacific. When he decides to stay he is confronted by Pastor Cobbett (Barry Jones), who lost both his father and his wife as a young missionary on the island. Cobbett rules Matareva as a Puritanical despot, using local bullies as "wardens" to enforce his rules. "Morgan Tane" stays on Matareva by winning the support of the natives after he defeats the wardens with the aid of an empty shotgun. Morgan has an illegitimate child, Turia (Moira Walker), by island girl Maeva (Roberta Haynes). After Maeva's death in childbirth, the distraught Morgan departs the island, leaving Turia behind with her grandmother.

Morgan returns to Matareva during World War II, where he reconciles with Cobbett, who has become a friend and teacher to the islanders, and meets Turia. She falls in love with an Army Air Force pilot, Harry Faber, after he crash-lands his cargo plane in the lagoon. An interesting irony is that when Morgan first arrived, Cobbett tried to force him to leave the island lest he get an island girl pregnant. Now he faces the same thing when Faber tries to seduce his daughter, Turia, as a diversion while awaiting pickup by the Navy. Morgan intervenes and makes Faber and his crew leave, using the same empty shotgun as an inducement. When Turia forgives him, Morgan decides to remain with her on Matareva.

Cast
 Gary Cooper as Mr. Morgan
 Barry Jones as Pastor Thomas Cobbett
 Roberta Haynes as Maeva
 Moira MacDonald as Turia
 John Hudson as Capt. Harry Faber
 Le Mamea Matatumua Ata as Tonga
 Hans Kruse as Rori, age 21
 Terry Dunleavy as Mac
 Howard Poulson as Russ
 Donald Ashford as Cutler
 Herbert Ah Sue as Kura
 Va'a as Rori, age 9

Soundtrack
The title song "Return to Paradise," by Dimitri Tiomkin and Ned Washington, was featured in the soundtrack. It has been recorded by artists including Nat King Cole, Bing Crosby and Shirley Horn.

Home media 
Return to Paradise was released on DVD on December 31, 2009, as part of the MGM Limited Edition Collection series.

References

External links
 
 
 
 

1953 films
1953 drama films
American drama films
1950s English-language films
English-language Samoan films
Films scored by Dimitri Tiomkin
Films based on short fiction
Films directed by Mark Robson
Films about interracial romance
Films set in Oceania
Films shot in Samoa
United Artists films
Films based on works by James A. Michener
Films set in the 1940s
Pacific War films
1950s American films
Films produced by Robert Wise